The Fabulettes were a group of the 1960s, which members were all Florida girls. They formed under name The Mar-Vells in the early '60s and did live concerts and session work for other Florida musicians. Paul Kelly worked with them during their first years.

From 1963 until 1968 or '69, the lineup consisted of Annette Snell, Mattie Lovett, Addie Williams, and Loretta Ludlow.

They changed their name to The Fabulettes on their first recording for Monument Records. When  Snell left the group to pursue a solo career, The Fabulettes attempted to find a replacement, but split up after cutting two more records.

References

American girl groups
Musical groups from Florida